The desert pygmy mouse (Mus indutus) is a species of rodent in the family Muridae.
It is found in Angola, Botswana, Namibia, South Africa, Zambia, and Zimbabwe.
Its natural habitats are dry savanna and subtropical or tropical high-altitude grassland.

Behaviour 

The desert pygmy mouse is territorial, but it can be found singularly, in pairs or in groups. It is nocturnal. Its diet consists of grass and other seeds, as well as insects.

For Desert pygmy mice in captivity some cases of cannibalism were observed.

References

Namibian Tourist Guide: Animals
Captive African Pygmy Mouse Diet

Mus (rodent)
Mammals described in 1910
Taxa named by Oldfield Thomas
Taxonomy articles created by Polbot